Abby Chin (born 1982) is an American sports journalist. She is a Boston Celtics basketball pregame and postgame reporter as well as a court-side reporter. She studied broadcasting at the University of Colorado Boulder and later interned in Colorado sports radio and television before becoming a sideline reporter covering the NBA. She is married and has two children.

References

University of Colorado Boulder alumni
Living people
Women sports journalists
American sports journalists
1982 births